The men's 100 metre backstroke SB14 event at the 2012 Paralympic Games took place on 31 August, at the London Aquatics Centre.

Three heats were held. The swimmers with the eight fastest times advanced to the final.

Heats

Heat 1

Heat 2

Heat 3

Final

References

Swimming at the 2012 Summer Paralympics